In ancient Rome, mental illness was thought to have been caused by divine punishment, demonic spirits, or an imbalance in the four humors. Ancient Roman doctors noticed patients with conditions similar to anxiety disorders, mood disorders, dyslexia, schizophrenia, speech disorders, among others. Anxiety was treated with Stoic practices similar to modern cognitive behavioral therapy, such as focusing on the present or analyzing the possible outcomes of a situation. Risk factors for mood disorders such as Bipolar disorder were thought to have been alcohol abuse, hypersexuality, aggression, and extreme emotions. Treatments included applying cool substances to the patient's head. People with intellectual disabilities were looked down upon, and they lacked legal protections. However, they could still function as laborers. People with possible schizophrenia were described by ancient Roman doctors and physicians, although they may have been describing mania instead of schizophrenia. Ancient doctors wrote that they should be treated with philosophy, intellectual activities, vomiting, leeching, bloodletting, and venipuncture.

Anxiety disorders 

Roman doctors and philosophers classified severe anxiety as a diagnosable medical condition. The Stoics, which were followers of a Roman philosophy centered around using self-control to overcome negative emotions, theorized methods of handling anxiety. Their methods resembled Cognitive behavioral therapy, which is a modern therapy for anxiety disorders. The Stoics would practice a technique known as negative visualization, which involved considering the worst possible outcome of an action or event, in order to prepare oneself for the consequences of it. They would also mentally rehearse how they would respond to such problems, and try to find a way to change negative situations into positive ones. The purpose of such practices was to train the practitioner to have little fear, and eventually allow them to remain calm in difficult situations. Seneca, a Roman stoic philosopher believed that to cure anxiety, one must focus on the present moment. Romans also used amulets to cope with anxiety and provide reassurance.

Galen, an ancient Greek medical doctor, had many patients with symptoms resembling Generalized Anxiety Disorder or Major Depressive Disorder, such as sweating, indigestion, palpitations, dizziness, fever, weight loss, insomnia, changing skin color, low heartbeat, and an irregular heartbeat. People with  this disease are described as having a progression of anxiety and sadness. It was believed that such anxiety could result in death. Galen states that this syndrome emerges from an emotion he calls . The word  is often translated as "distress" or "grief." , in his view, was worry about future events. , according to Cicero, was an outburst of emotion.

Plutarch, an ancient Greek philosopher and historian, describes an ancient Roman man possibly with scrupulosity, which is guilt or anxiety over religious subjects. It is commonly associated with Obsessive–compulsive disorder, and Obsessive–compulsive personality disorder. Only OCD is recognized as an anxiety disorder. This man is described as "turning pale under his crown of flowers," praying with a "faltering voice," and scattering "incense with trembling hands."

Mood disorders 
Mood disorders were frequently described in ancient Roman medical literature. Greek doctors termed a condition resulting in poor appetite, lethargy, sleeplessness, irritability, agitation, and long-lasting fears and hopelessness melancholia, which is now known as depression. Roman doctors such as Galen believed this disorder also caused delusions, anguish, and cancer. Rufus of Ephesus wrote that Melancholiacs experienced episodes of fear, indigestion, and doubt. They also experienced delusions. He describes Melancholiacs believing they were pots, or that their skin had become parchment. Melancholiacs also experienced changes in appearance and behavior. Such as darkened complexion, protruding eyes, more hair, and disfluency. Rufus divided Melancholia into three categories. He defined the first type as the body becoming completely filled with Melancholy blood, the second was when only the brain was affected, and third primarily affected the hypochdonrium. Celsus, a Roman encyclopedist, believed that to treat this disease, bloodletting should be used. If bloodletting was not an option, hellebore should be used to make the patient vomit. In addition, patients should be provided with exercise, intellectual activities, and they should abstain from wine.

Aretaeus of Cappadocia, a Greek physician who lived in the Roman province of Cappadocia, describes melancholic patients who experience episodes of depression and suicidal ideation. Alongside episodes of "impure dreams" where they have "irresistible desires." In this state they are easily angered by criticism, and they become "wholly mad." Aretaeus also describes people with  this disease experiencing hallucinations and delusions. This disorder resembles bipolar disorder, which is defined by episodes of mania and depression. It was thought to be caused by too much black and yellow bile. Galen wrote that phobias and dysthymia, another depressive disorder, could cause melancholia. Alcohol abuse, hypersexuality, aggression, and extreme emotions were thought to increase the risk of developing this disorder. It is unclear if ancient doctors thought of the mania and depression present in these people as separate conditions, or one singular condition. Lithium is a chemical element used to treat bipolar disorder. This element can be found in alkaline springs near Ephesus, an ancient city in Turkey. The Roman doctor Soranus of Ephesus noticed that the condition of people with this disorder would improve after they drank from these springs. Other common treatments included applying cool materials to a patient's head.

Seasonal affective disorder is a medical condition in which the affected person experiences mood changes alongside seasonal changes. One treatment for this disorder is light therapy. The Romans knew that exposure to light could serve as a treatment for those affected by certain conditions. However, they did not know why. Cicero experienced several depressive episodes over the course of his lifetime. During these periods he kept a journal documenting his days, and his sadness. This technique has been found to alleviate depression and sadness, and it is a form of therapy still used today. Magical objects were used to treat anger. Users would offload their feelings onto these objects.

Neurodevelopmental disorders 

Romans with intellectual disabilities had limited rights. They may have been capable of functioning in normal society by helping with menial labor. However, they were also considered property of their father or were kept as slaves. Intellectually disabled people were considered to be on the same level as children, and they could not marry, hold office, or raise children. Roman society considered these people to be burdens to society. To avoid this, many were killed early in childhood, and their bodies were dumped into the Tiber in order to avoid them burdening society. However, they were exempt from their crimes under Roman law.

These disorders were thought of as a sign of unintelligence. Emperor Claudius had such a condition, which was likely either cerebral palsy or Tourette syndrome. His mother and the rest of Roman society thought of him as mentally deficient, less of a man, and "unfinished by nature." Stuttering is a speech disorder characterized by involuntary repetition or prolongations of sounds and pauses in speech. It was thought to be caused by an excessively moist tongue, or an excessively dry tongue. Galen recommended wrapping the tongue with a cloth soaked in lettuce juice to treat a stutter. Another treatment for a speech disorder was tongue massages and gargling. A young Roman boy by the name of Bradua was described as being unable to read, and Livy speaks about Roman adults who could not achieve literacy on par with young children. It is possible these people were dyslexic. Dyslexic Romans could achieve high status in Roman society; for example, Bradua became a consul. Treatments for intellectual disabilities included nutritional diets combined with exercise. Roman emperor Augustus was described by Suetonius as having difficulty learning to read or write and having trouble remembering his speeches despite his intelligence, possibly indicating that Augustus had dyslexia. However, Suetonius may have been trying to highlight imperfections in Augustus to make Hadrian seem like the superior emperor. It is also possible that Augustsus had poor education, or was writing with unconventional orthography.

Schizophrenia 

Ancient Roman doctors described a condition they termed phrenitis or mania. It was theorized that this condition was caused by high amounts of bile due to fever, which would heat the blood, resulting in the onset of an illness. Ancient doctors noticed that this disorder appeared most frequently in young and middle-aged men, and that it appeared rarely in children, women, or older adults. Modern scholars disagree on the nature of this condition. It is possible that it is schizophrenia. However, others believe that there are no mentions of schizophrenia in ancient literature – that schizophrenia, in its modern form, did not exist in ancient times.

Celsus, a Roman physician, described a mental illness which induced episodes of delirium and incoherent speech. Celsus also wrote about a chronic condition which resulted in "entertaining vain images" and caused the mind to be "at the mercy of such imaginings." He distinguished between differing types of this disease. According to Celsus, some were saddened, some became "hilarious," some began to "rave in words," some remained composed, others became "rebellious and violent" Various types of violence are described. Some "do harm by impulse," while others appear to remain sane, yet still commit elaborate acts of violence. Celsus may be describing delusions caused by psychosis, which are false beliefs unable to be changed by evidence to the contrary. He also may be describing a depressive disorder. Celsus mentions certain delusions. He states that one patient believed they could interact with Ajax or Orestes. Arataeus writes about mentally ill people with hallucinations, disorganized speech, delusions, social withdrawal, poor performance at work, and catatonia. He believed that these people had mania, however they may have had schizophrenia.

A variety of treatments were used. For example, doctors would express disapproval of excessive laughter. Cymbals were used to play music, which was thought to reduce melancholic thoughts. Philosophers were used to alleviate the fear and worry the patient experiences. Doctors recommended that patients should be treated through conversation. Servants were supposed to engage in dialogue with the patient. However, they should not agree with everything they say, as this might feed into the delusions. They were also not supposed to disagree with everything the person said, as this might enrage them. The patients were also provided a variety of intellectual activities to keep them engaged. These activities would have been tailored to each patient.

It was common to treat these people by confining them to a dark room. Celsus believed that this form of therapy's usefulness varied from person to person. Some will be frightened by the darkness, other will be calmed. He recommended that "strong" patients should be kept in a bright room, and "weak" ones should be kept in a dim room. Celsus also recommended torture. Violent patients were restrained using chains and flogging. Deprivation of light, immersion into cold water, torturous exercise, food depravation were all used. Patients were also supposed to only be left with people they were familiar with, and frequently travel and move. They were forced to pay attention and memorize this torture, thus preventing patients from acting out through fear. This treatment was dismissed by two physicians Asclepiades of Bithynia and Soranus of Ephesus as inhumane. They believed that instead, patients should kept in a moderately light room located on the ground floor, eat a simple diet, and have regular exercise. They also recommended that soft fabrics, wool, or servant's hands should be used instead of chains to restrain them.

Bloodletting was another contentious topic. Asclepiades believed it to be equivalent to murder. Celsus disagreed, stating that if a patient was "strong," it must be administered if they are experiencing an extreme episode of the condition. He also recommended that one day after the bloodletting the head should be shaved and cleaned with water. Herbs such as verbena would be boiled in the water. Another procedure consisted of cleaning the head, shaving the head, cleaning it again, then pouring rose oil over it. Concurrent to this, rue pounded with vinegar would be poured over the nose. If the patient is considered "weak" then thyme, or a similar substance, would be applied to rose oil which would then be rubbed over the head. Bitter pellitory herbs would also be applied to the patient's head.

People with this condition also had trouble sleeping and eating. To treat this, they were placed on couches near food. Poppy, Hyoscyamus, saffron ointment, mandrake apples, cardamomum balsam, the sound of falling water, sycamine tears, and mulberry were all thought to aid in sleep. Asclepiades believed these treatments to be ineffective, and that they caused lethargy. Leeches, venesection, and vomiting were also common treatments. An orchid known as white hellebore was used to induce vomit. Doctors would give these patients gruel and mead to eat and drink. Three cups of gruel were given twice a day in winter and three times in summer.

Paraphiliac and fetishistic disorders 

Foot fetishism, klismaphilia, and pedophilia were widespread in ancient Rome. Bestiality, or the sexual attraction to animals is prominent in Roman mythology. Roman shepherds would frequently practice zoophilia, and Roman women would train snakes to slide past their vaginas and coil around their thighs. The Romans would also have animals rape men and women in the Colosseum or Circus Maximus for entertainment purposes. Ancient Roman brothels were often named after the animal species which they offered for sexual purposes. For example, brothels that offered birds were known as ansenarii, if they offered dogs they were termed belluarii, and caprarii were brothels that offered goats.

Substance abuse disorders 

The Romans generally did not conceive of substance related disorders. Alcoholism was an exception. Roman writers believed alcoholism would result in decreased sexual potency and damage to the social order. It was thought that alcohol would cause adultery and promiscuity in women. Despite this, it was widespread amongst all social castes in Roman society. Pliny believed that "a great part of mankind are of the opinion that there is nothing else in life worth living for" and that alcoholics were "driven to frenzy" and a "thousand crimes." Galen describes a teacher's young slave dying after consuming large amounts of alcohol. Cannabis was mentioned numerous times in Roman literature. The Romans believed that it could be used to create strong ropes and repel mosquitos. Cannabis was also believed to decrease sexual activity, cause impotence, and cause nausea. Cannabis was said to cause headaches and a "warm" feeling when consumed in great quantities. Roman doctors were unaware of the plant's psychoactive properties. Opium was a drug used by Roman doctors to treat illnesses such as insomnia, pain, coughs, hysteria, and conditions involving the digestive system. They were aware of how addictive opium was, and how dangerous an overdose could be.

Cognitive disorders 

The ancient Romans were aware of dementia. It was believed that people with  the disease were foolish, and no longer contributed to society. The Romans feared dementia, as they thought that a life without intellectual capabilities was not worth living. Delirium was known as a symptom of Phrenitis and Mania. Roman doctors differentiated between delirium, which is extreme confusion, and psychosis, which confusion between what is and is not real. They believed that black bile and plants such as belladonna, mandragona, opium, and thorn apple caused delirium. Celsus and Galen described brain injuries in their writings. These patients have symptoms such as dizziness. Roman doctors associated brain injury with speech impairments, incontinence, and leg paralysis.

Post-traumatic stress disorder 

Post-traumatic stress disorder is a disorder defined by stress caused by traumatic events. Cultural differences and differences in warfare likely resulted in PTSD being less prominent in ancient militaries. Soldiers fought in close formations, with less brutal weaponry that what is used in the modern day, in shorter campaigns. They believed what they were doing was a moral responsibility to their society, and they were exposed to violence more frequently. These factors likely contributed to PTSD being rarer in ancient Rome. Other factors may have contributed to the development of this disorder. Soldiers often chose to fight and remain combat rather than face the disgrace and humiliation that refusing to fight would bring upon them. This put many soldiers at risk of developing PTSD and Acute stress disorder. Celsus, a Roman doctor described a condition named Insania sine fibre. Which translates to "mania without fever." This condition involved hearing and seeing things which were not real, irrationality, depression, loss of appetite, frightfulness, mood swings, eye movements, and hypervigilance. Galen, another Roman doctor described patients with anxiety, anger, depression, and malaise. Celsus prescribed Hypericum and Galen prescribed massages, lukewarm water, wine and water, bathing, exercise, and food with sweet juices.

Others 

Juvenal, a Roman poet, complained about the noise of the city making it difficult to sleep, causing insomnia. Pervasive insomnia throughout ancient Rome resulted in numerous deaths. They used sleep deprivation to torture criminals and prisoners. Sleepwalking was associated with evil spirits. Roman men could often develop hypochondriasis due to their tendency to discuss and pay attention to medical matters. Eating disorders were considered to be problematic by the Romans. A possible ancient example of anorexia nervosa, an eating disorder characterized by extremely limited consumption of food, involved a Roman saint named Blaesilla. She was a disciple of Jerome. She practiced fasting, eventually succumbing to her hunger and dying at the age of 20. Ancient writers mention people who faked mental illnesses to escape responsibilities. In the modern day, deliberately feigning a mental illness for attention is known as factitious disorder imposed on self. If done for financial or personal gain, it is known as malingering. If done with a motive on others, it is known as Factitious disorder imposed on another. Ancient writers, such as Homer, Hippocrates, and Aretaeus, noticed an individual with intense emotions, impulsive behavior, extreme anger, depression, and mania. These symptoms are reminiscent of Borderline personality disorder, a Cluster B personality disorder characterized by unstable relationships, strong emotions, and impulsive behavior.

Scientific understanding 

Disabilities were thought to have been caused by a divine punishment. Demons and evil spirits were considered to be an explanation for some mental illnesses. It was also believed that mental illnesses could be developed due to natural or biological causes. The dominant theory in ancient Rome was humorism, which is the idea that each person had a group of four humors. If they were balanced then the individual would develop illnesses, including mental ones. The pulse and heartbeat of the affected person were also used to diagnose. Galen believed that negative emotions imbalanced the mind, causing disease. He believed that these emotions caused blood to retreat to "the depths of the body." Resulting in many negative symptoms and diseases such as melancholia and depression. It was believed that seasons could affect the illnesses. Changes in weather were thought to stir up the humors.

The Romans noticed that diseases and conditions, such as epilepsy, could be inherited. Roman doctors also distinguished between people with mental illness, and those at risk of mental illness. Ancient doctors categorized some people into a "half-mad" category, which meant symptoms only emerged while drunk or stressed. Popular medications included beaver testicles, weasels, smoked camel brains, and tickling patients with their head near a fire.

References 

Depression (mood)
Anorexia nervosa
Mood disorders
Schizophrenia
Stoicism
History of mental disorders
Bipolar disorder
Ancient Roman medicine